Bucky Johnson was an American baseball second baseman in the Negro leagues. He played with the Brooklyn Royal Giants in 1936 and 1937 and the Newark Eagles in 1939.

References

External links
 and Baseball-Reference Black Baseball stats and Seamheads

Brooklyn Royal Giants players
Newark Eagles players
Year of birth missing
Year of death missing
Baseball second basemen